From the ashes is a metaphor related to the mythological phoenix.

From the Ashes may refer to:

 From the Ashes (album), a 2003 album by Pennywise
 From the Ashes (Dungeons & Dragons), a supplement for Dungeons & Dragonss World of Greyhawk campaign setting
 From the Ashes: The Life and Times of Tick Hall, a 2003 documentary film
 From the Ashes: Nicaragua Today, a 1982 documentary film
 "From the Ashes", a song by Borealis from the 2015 album Purgatory
 "From the Ashes", a song by Mike Oldfield featured on the 1999 album Guitars
 "From the Ashes" (Agents of S.H.I.E.L.D.), an episode of Agents of S.H.I.E.L.D.
 From the Ashes (memoir), a memoir by Jesse Thistle

See also 

 
 
 Out of the Ashes (disambiguation)
 Up from the Ashes (disambiguation)